Manfred Hermann Wagner (born 1948) is the author of Wagner model and the molecular stress function theory for polymer rheology.
He is a Professor for Polymer engineering and Polymer physics at the Technical University of Berlin.

Manfred was born in Stuttgart, Germany in 1948. He obtained his PhD in Chemical engineering at the Institute for Polymer Processing of Stuttgart University. He worked as a post-doc in Polymer Physics under Joachim Meissner at the Eidgenössische Technische Hochschule in Zurich, and in the Plastic industry, then he returned to Stuttgart University in 1988 as Professor for Fluid Dynamics and Rheology. In 1998–1999, he was Dean of the Faculty of Chemical Engineering and Engineering Cybernetics of Stuttgart University. In 1999, he moved to Technical University of Berlin.

His works include the constitutive equations for polymer melts, the application of rheology to the processing of polymers, and structure-property relationships for polymers. The focus of his work on rheology is the field of non-linear shear and elongational behavior of polymer melts and effects of polydispersity, branching and blending on melt behavior. The outstanding point associated with Wagner's work is the relative simplicity of the structural picture of the polymer chain and its respective mathematical formulation.

His latest contribution to the constitutive modeling, the MSF (Molecular Stress Function) theory, assumes a microstructure-based damping function (developed by himself in the late 1970s) that modifies the tube model of Doi and Edwards by considering the tube diameter to change with deformation. This assumption overcomes the most important disadvantage of the DE theory and produces excellent predictions consistent with the picture of the polymer chain.

He has published to date over 100 scientific papers. In 1981, he received the annual award of the British Society of Rheology . The Institute of Materials, London, awarded him the Swinburne Award 2002.

Wagner was the President of the German Society of Rheology 1991–2003, and he is Secretary of the European Society of Rheology since 1996.

Until 2008 Wagner and Rolon-Garrido are studying the constitutive equations model to improve the rheology model at Polymertechnik/Polymerphysik at the TU-Berlin.
Other rheological projects as polymer/additive interactions are being studied by Wagner and Marco Müller.

Selected papers
Modeling non-Gaussian extensibility effects in elongation of nearly monodisperse polystyrene melts V.H. Rolon-Garrido, M. H. Wagner with C. Luap, T. Schweizer Journal of Rheology 50(3)27–340 May/June 2006
"Quantitative prediction of transient and steady-state elongational viscosity of nearly monodisperse polystyrene melts, with S. Kheirandish and O. Hassager, Journal of Rheology, 49:1317–1327 (2005)"
"Exponential shear flow of branched polyethylenes in rotational parallel-plate geometry, with V.-H. Rolon-Garrido, K. Chai Rheologica Acta, 45:164–173 (2005)"
"Modeling strain hardening of polydisperse polystyrene melts by molecular stress function theory, with S. Kheirandish, K. Koyama, A. Nishioka, A. Minegishi and T. Takahsahi, Rheologica Acta, 44:235–243 (2005)"
"Quantitative analysis of melt elongational behavior of LLDPE/LDPE blends, with S. Kheirandish and M. Yamaguchi Rheologica Acta, 44:198–218 (2005)"
"Relating rheology and molecular structure of model branched polystyrene melts by molecular stress function theory, with J. Hepperle and H. Münstedt Journal of Rheology, 48:489–503(2004)"
"Quantitative assessment of strain hardening of low-density polyethylene melts by the molecular stress function model, with M. Yamaguchi and M. Takahsahi Journal of Rheology, 47:779–793(2003)"
"The molecular stress function model for polydisperse polymer melts with dissipative convective constraint release, with P. Rubio and H. Bastian, Journal of Rheology, 45:1387–1412(2003)"
"Determination of elongational viscosity of polymer melts by RME and Rheotens experiments, Journal of Rheology, 41:316–325(2002) "
"The strain-hardening behaviour of linear and long-chain-branched polyolefin melts in extensional flows, with H. Bastian, P. Hachmann, J. Meissner, S. Kurzbeck, H. Münstedt and F. Langouche, Rheologica Acta, 39:97–109 (2000)"
"LDPE melt rheology and the pom–pom model, with P. Rubio Journal of Non-Newtonian Fluid Mechanics, 92:245–259 (2000)"
"The rheology of the rheotens test, with A. Bernnat and V. Schulze Journal of Rheology, 42:917–928(1998)"
"Nonlinear viscoelastic characterization of a linear polyethylene (HDPE) melt in rotational and irrotational flows, Journal of Non-Newtonian Fluid Mechanics, 79:283–296 (1998)"
"A constitutive analysis of uniaxial, equibiaxial and planar extension of a commercial linear high-density polyethylene melt, with P. Ehrecke, P. Hachmann and J. Meissner Journal of Rheology, 42:621–638(1998)"
"Dynamics of polymer melts in reversing shear flows, with P. Ehrecke Journal of Non-Newtonian Fluid Mechanics, 76:183–197 (1998)"
"A note on the melt strength of liquid crystalline polymer, with Th. Ixner and K. Geiger Journal of Rheology, 41:1087–1093(1997)"
"Damping functions and nonlinear viscoelasticity—a review, Journal of Non-Newtonian Fluid Mechanics, 68:169–171 (1997)"
"The origin of the C2 term in rubber elasticit, Journal of Rheology, 38:655–679(1994)"
"Rubbers and polymer melts: Universal aspects of nonlinear stress–strain relations, with J. Schaeffer Journal of Rheology, 37:643–661(1993)"
"Nonlinear strain measures for general biaxial extension of polymer melts, with J. Schaeffer Journal of Rheology, 36:1–26(1992)"
"A constitutive analysis of extensional flows of polyisobutylene, with A. Demarmels Journal of Rheology, 34:943–958(1990)"
"Constant force elongational flow of a low-density polyethylene melt—experiment and theory", Journal of Non-Newtonian Fluid Mechanics, with T. Raible, S. E. Stephenson and J. Meissner11:239–256 (1982)
"The Irreversibility Assumption of Network Disentanglement in Flowing Polymer Melts and its Effects on Elastic Recoil Predictions, with S. E. Stephenson Journal of Rheology, 23:489–504(1979)"
"A constitutive analysis of uniaxial elongational flow data of low-density polyethylene melt", Journal of Non-Newtonian Fluid Mechanics, 4:39–55 (1978)

External links
 
 Wagner's TU Berlin Homepage
 

1948 births
Living people
20th-century German mathematicians
20th-century German physicists
Polymer scientists and engineers
Rheologists
Members of the European Academy of Sciences and Arts
21st-century German mathematicians
Academic staff of the Technical University of Berlin
21st-century German physicists